Ramona is a Mexican telenovela produced by Lucy Orozco for Televisa that premiered on April 3, 2000 and ended on July 14, 2000. Based on the 1884 novel Ramona by Helen Hunt Jackson. It was the last telenovela of Eduardo Palomo, who died in 2003 of a heart attack. It was also the first telenovela of Tony Dalton.

Kate del Castillo, Eduardo Palomo and René Strickler starred as protagonists, while Sergio Sendel as the main antagonist. Shaula Vega, Kristoff Raczyñski, Raúl Ochoa and Ramón Menendez starred as antagonists. Helena Rojo starred as stellar performance.

Plot 
Ramona returns to the family ranch after years of being educated by nuns. Ramona reunites with her mother and brother and childhood friend, the Indian Alejandro. Ramona falls in love with Alejandro and the couple is faced with the prejudices of being an interracial couple.

The family selects a suitable husband for Ramona and a wedding is planned. Family secrets come to light exposing the truth of Ramona's birth and her Indian heritage. The ill-fated romance continues when Alejandro kidnaps Ramona at the altar.

The two enjoy a short-lived honeymoon before Alejandro is taken captive by the authorities and is hanged. Ramona returns home  to live with her mother and Felipe who has loved her since childhood. Ramona is pregnant with Alejandro's child, so she and Felipe get married.

This ill-fated romance is played out against the backdrop of the impending statehood of the Mexican territory, which ultimately becomes what is most often referred to as California.

Cast 
 
Kate del Castillo as Maria Ramona Moreno Gonzaga
Eduardo Palomo as Alejandro de Asís
Helena Rojo as Doña Ramona Gonzaga Vda. de Moreno
René Strickler as Felipe Moreno Gonzaga
Sergio Sendel as Rex/Jack Green
Antonio Medellín as Don Pablo de Asís
Rafael Inclán as Juan Canito
Angelina Peláez as Martha Canito
Vanessa Bauche as Margarita Canito
René Casados as Angus O'Fail
Ricardo Blume as Ruy Coronado
Felipe Nájera as Fernando Coronado
Gabriela Murray as Analupe Coronado
Nicky Mondellini as Beatriz de Echague
Chela Castro as Perpetua de Echague
Luis Couturier as César de Echagüe
Juan Ríos Cantú as El Norteño
Álvaro Carcaño as Father Salvatierra
Kristoff as Davis
Raúl Ochoa as Merryl
Ramón Menéndez as Dr. Thomas
Isela Vega as Matea
Shaula Vega as Manuela
Roberto "Flaco" Guzmán as Nepo
Andrés García Jr. as Billy Dubois
Luis Bayardo as Father Sarriá
Paty Díaz as Carmen
Oscar Traven as Abraham McQueen
Montserrat Olivier as Doris
Eugenio Cobo as General Alonso Moreno
Jorge Capin as Pepe
Tony Dalton as Tom
Antonio Escobar as Antonio
Francisco Casasola as Lobo Solitario
Martín Rojas as Sebastián Lorenzo
Andreas Pearce as Prescott
Christian Tappan as Colorado
Zamorita as Negro Memphis
Ernesto Bog as Marcos
José Luis Avendaño as Lucio
Alicia del Lago as Sofía
Marcela Morett as Yahale
Hilda Nájera as Polita
Maja Schnellman as Betty
Ximena Adriana as Delgadima
Luis de Icaza as Douglas
Claudio Sorel as Dr. Oviedo
Daniel Gauvry as Dr. Brown

Awards

References

External links
 on Televisa 

2000 telenovelas
Mexican telenovelas
2000 Mexican television series debuts
2000 Mexican television series endings
Spanish-language telenovelas
Television shows set in California
Televisa telenovelas